"Run" is a song recorded by South Korean boy band BTS as the lead single for their fourth extended play, The Most Beautiful Moment in Life, Pt. 2 (2015). The original Korean version was released by Big Hit Entertainment on November 30, 2015, in South Korea. The Japanese single version was released on March 15, 2016, under the Pony Canyon label.

Composition
“Run” has been described as a dance-rock song with lyrics about continuing to get up and run, even if obstacles continue to knock you down. The song is composed in the key of F# minor at a tempo of 133 beats per minute.

Editions
The Korean version of the song was not released as a separate single. Two official remixes—a Ballad Remix and Alternative Remix—were included on The Most Beautiful Moment in Life: Young Forever compilation album, which was released on May 2, 2016.

The Japanese version of "Run" was released as an individual single and included two B-side songs: "Butterfly", the Japanese version of the song of the same name from the original Korean EP, and "Good Day", an original Japanese track. Four editions of the single were made available:
 Limited Edition [CD + DVD] (PCCA-4360): This edition included a DVD containing the album jacket photo shoot making-of footage.
 Regular Edition [CD Only] (PCCA-4361): This edition included 1 of 8 collectible photocards available only with first press albums.
 Loppi·HMV Limited Edition [CD + Goods] (BRCA-00072): This edition included a 13-page CD Jacket Desk Calendar with member photos.
 Pony Canyon BTS SHOP Edition [CD Only] (SCCA.00039): This was an Analog LP-sized Jacket edition with a large, full color photo insert.

Music video and promotion
The teaser for the Korean version of the song was released by Big Hit Entertainment on November 25, 2015 (KST), and the music video was released on November 30, 2015. The video depicts the foolhardiness of youth, both within the context of joyful moments of friendship as well as in the midst of suffering and enduring through difficult life situations. It showcases not only the members' musical talents but also their acting abilities, with a narrative that connects to the music video for “I Need U” and the "화양연화 on stage : prologue" video. A music video for the Japanese version was uploaded to YouTube on March 11, 2016. Both versions were directed by Choi YongSeok from Lumpens with Ko Yoojung, Lee Wonju, Ko Hyunji, and Jung Noori serving as assistant directors. The director of photography was Nam Hyunwoo of GDW. Other personnel are Joo Byungik the focus puller, Song Hyunsuk who served as the gaffer, Song Kwangho working the jimmyjib, and Lee Moonyoung who provided art.

The "Run" music video, uploaded on both Big Hit Entertainment and 1theK’s YouTube channels, received nearly 2 million combined views in less than 24 hours, the fastest record achieved by BTS at the time. 

BTS promoted the original version of the song on several Korean music programs, including Music Bank, Inkigayo, M Countdown, and Show Champion.

Accolades
On December 7, 2015, the group received a weekly Melon Popularity Award for "Run". Later that month, Billboard ranked "Run" the third best K-pop song of 2015, where they wrote that it "found the perfect balance of their hardcore hip-hop style with sentimental leanings." They further added that "It's a song like this solidifies a group's place in K-pop." "Run" additionally achieved the top spots on the music programs The Show, Show Champion, and Music Bank.

Track listing

Credits
The Korean credits are adapted from the CD liner notes of "Run".

Pdogg – producer, keyboard, synthesizer, vocal & rap arrangement, recording engineer @ Dogg Bounce
"Hitman" Bang – producer
Rap Monster –  producer
Suga –  producer
V – producer
Jungkook – producer, chorus
J-Hope – producer
Jeong Jaepil – guitar
James F. Reynolds – mix engineer

Charts

Sales

Release history

References

2015 songs
2015 singles
2016 singles
BTS songs
Songs written by Bang Si-hyuk
Music videos directed by Lumpens
Songs written by Pdogg
Songs written by J-Hope
Songs written by Suga (rapper)
Hybe Corporation singles